The following are the national records in athletics in Grenada maintained by its national athletics federation: Grenada Athletic Association (GAA).

Outdoor

Key to tables:

+ = en route to a longer distance

h = hand timing

A = affected by altitude

OT = oversized track (> 200m in circumference)

y = denotes one mile

Men

Women

Indoor

Men

Women

Notes

References
General
World Athletics Statistic Handbook 2019: National Outdoor Records
World Athletics Statistic Handbook 2018: National Indoor Records
Specific

External links

Grenada
Records